Alberto Puig (born 16 January 1967) is a Spanish former Grand Prix solo motorcycle professional road racer who is team manager for the Repsol Honda team in MotoGP.

Motorcycle racing career
Puig had his best year in 1994, when he finished in fifth place in the 500 cc class. In 1995, Puig became the first Spanish competitor to win his home nation's 500 cc Grand Prix when he won the 1995 Spanish Grand Prix. He then scored two more podium results to place himself in third place in the world championship, before he crashed heavily during practice for the 1995 French Grand Prix and broke his left leg, ending his season prematurely. He returned in 1996 but his injuries hindered his progress and he decided to retire at the end of the 1997 season at the age of 30.

Team manager
Puig runs the Red Bull MotoGP Academy, designed to find and train promising Grand Prix racers and, he is credited with starting the careers of Casey Stoner, Dani Pedrosa and Toni Elías. Puig also acted as manager for Pedrosa. He was named as Repsol Honda's team principal for the 2018 season and has continued in that role through the present 2022 season.

Despite having only ever won one race, Puig stirred controversy in the sport by diminishing the value of the 2020 season following Marc Marquez's crash in the opening round by stating, "But my opinion, and I know what I am talking about, is that when you win but the champion is not on the track you always have something left inside." "I will set my example: I won a race here in 1995, and I've always wondered if I would have won it if Mick Doohan hadn't fallen." Jack Miller responded that he had "heard two people say now two questions about the validity of the championship, and it's a complete crock".

Motorcycle Grand Prix Results
Points system from 1969 to 1987:

Points system from 1988 to 1991:

Points system in 1992:

Points system from 1993:

(key) (Races in bold indicate pole position; races in italics indicate fastest lap)

References

External links
 Alberto Puig Honda team manager profile
 Red Bull MotoGP Academy Official website
 Piloto leyenda - Alberto Puig Biography 

1967 births
Living people
Motorcycle racers from Catalonia
Spanish motorcycle racers
250cc World Championship riders
500cc World Championship riders
Sportspeople from Barcelona